Sílvio Escobar Benitez (born 18 July 1986) is a Paraguayan-born Indonesian professional footballer who plays as a forward for Liga 2 club Semen Padang.

Club career

Persepam Madura United
In January 2014, he made his debut with Persepam Madura United against Arema and he scored one goal although the final result Persepam lost 1-3.

Perseru Serui
In March 2017, Escobar signed a one-year contract with Indonesian Liga 1 club Perseru Serui. He made his debut on 20 April 2017 in a match against Bhayangkara. On 25 April 2017, Escobar scored his first goal for Perseru against Persiba Balikpapan in the 22nd minute at the Marora Stadium, Yapen.

Persija Jakarta
He was signed for Persija Jakarta to play in Liga 1 in the 2019 season.

PSIS Semarang (loan)
He was signed for PSIS Semarang to play in the Liga 1 in the 2019 season, on loan from Persija Jakarta. Escobar made his debut on 16 May 2019 in a match against Kalteng Putra. On 26 June 2019, Escobar scored his first goal for PSIS against Badak Lampung in the 3rd minute at the Sumpah Pemuda Stadium, Bandar Lampung. He made 15 league appearances and scored 2 goals for PSIS Semarang.

TIRA-Persikabo
In January 2020, Escobar signed a one-year contract with Indonesian Liga 1 club TIRA-Persikabo. He made his debut on 2 March 2020 in a match against Arema. On 15 March 2020, Escobar scored his first goal for TIRA-Persikabo against Persita Tangerang in the 83rd minute at the Pakansari Stadium, Bogor.

PSMS Medan (loan)
He was signed for PSMS Medan to play in the Liga 2 in the 2020 season, on loan from TIRA-Persikabo. This season was suspended on 27 March 2020 due to the COVID-19 pandemic. The season was abandoned and was declared void on 20 January 2021.

Madura United
In 2021, Escobar signed a contract with Indonesian Liga 1 club Madura United. He made his league debut on 3 September 2021 in a match against Persikabo 1973 at the Indomilk Arena, Tangerang.

References

External links
 
 Silvio Escobar at Liga Indonesia

1986 births
Living people
Sportspeople from Asunción
Indonesian footballers
Paraguayan footballers
Paraguayan expatriate footballers
Association football forwards
Paraguayan expatriate sportspeople in Argentina
Expatriate footballers in Argentina
Paraguayan expatriate sportspeople in Indonesia
Expatriate footballers in Indonesia
Liga 1 (Indonesia) players
Liga 2 (Indonesia) players
Club Atlético Douglas Haig players
Club Sportivo San Lorenzo footballers
Club Atlético Tembetary players
Persepam Madura Utama players
PSM Makassar players
Bali United F.C. players
Perseru Serui players
Persija Jakarta players
PSIS Semarang players
Persikabo 1973 players
PSMS Medan players
Persiraja Banda Aceh players
Madura United F.C. players
Semen Padang F.C. players
Naturalised citizens of Indonesia
Paraguayan emigrants to Indonesia